50% may refer to:

One half, an irreducible fraction
"50%", a 2006 song by Grandaddy from Just Like the Fambly Cat

See also
"50% & 50%", a 1993 song by Hide
Middle 50% or interquartile range, a measure of statistical dispersion